DZSO (720 AM) Bombo Radyo is a radio station owned and operated by Bombo Radyo Philippines through its licensee Newsounds Broadcasting Network. Its studio and transmitter are located at Bombo Radyo Broadcast Center, Pennsylvania Ave., Parian, San Fernando, La Union. DZSO operates daily from 4:00 AM to 9:30 PM.

References

Radio stations in La Union
Radio stations established in 1985
1985 establishments in the Philippines